Hani Talab al-Qawasmi is a Palestinian politician. He was born in Gaza, although his family originated from Hebron in the modern-day West Bank and emigrated to Gaza in 1949. Al-Qawasmi received his BA degree in accounting from Cairo University and pursued his studies and got a high diploma in human resources from Cairo University. Al-Qawasmi worked at the religious al-Azhar Institute for 10 years. He worked with the establishment of the Palestinian National Authority in its Civil Affairs Ministry for 7 years.

He currently works as general director of administrative affairs at the Interior Ministry, effectively the Interior Minister of the Palestinian National Authority, upon a decision from the Cabinet.

In May 2007, the coalition deal between Hamas and Fatah appeared to be weaker, as new fighting broke out between the two factions. This was considered a major setback. Al-Qawasmi, who had been considered a moderate civil servant acceptable to both factions, resigned due to what he termed harmful behavior by both factions.

Al-Qawasmi is currently married with five children.

See also
History of the Israeli-Palestinian conflict

References

Living people
Year of birth missing (living people)
People from Gaza City
Interior ministers of the Palestinian National Authority
Government ministers of the Palestinian National Authority